

The Fauvel AV.50 Lutin (originally designated the AV.61) was a design for an unorthodox light aircraft produced in France in the 1970s. Like some other Charles Fauvel designs, it was a tailless aircraft with a reverse-delta wing. In this case, it was a single-seater intended to be powered by a converted Volkswagen engine. Only one example was known to have been under construction by 1977, in Australia.

Options for the builder included the use of a Rotax engine in place of the Volkswagen unit, and a choice of tandem, tailwheel, or tricycle undercarriage.

Specifications (as designed)

See also

References
 
 

1970s French sport aircraft
Fauvel aircraft
Tailless aircraft
Homebuilt aircraft
Single-engined tractor aircraft